Scopula tenuiscripta is a moth of the  family Geometridae. It is found in South Africa.

References

Endemic moths of South Africa
Moths described in 1917
tenuiscripta
Moths of Africa